Herb "Hub" Arkush (born February 14, 1953) is an American football sportscaster and analyst. He is the editor and general manager of Chicago Football and ChicagoFootball.com, a magazine and website devoted to coverage and analysis of all things football in northern Illinois, particularly the Chicago Bears. He also is the publisher and editor of Pro Football Weekly.

Life
Arkush attended Deerfield High School and attended college at Southern Illinois University before transferring to the University of Michigan, where he majored in English and physical education.

Career
Since 2013, Arkush has teamed with Shawn Media to lead the Chicago Football project. Chicago Football is a magazine, website and TV show dedicated to coverage of the Bears and other football topics relevant to northern Illinois. He created and co-hosted the syndicated Pro Football Weekly radio and TV shows, and also worked as a radio commentator on the Chicago Bears Radio Network from 1987 to 2004. Since 2006 he has also served as an analyst and sideline reporter on the Westwood One national radio broadcasts of NFL games, and is a contributor to WBBM radio and WBBM-TV. As an NFL insider, he is a regular fill-in host and contributor for sports radio station (and WBBM radio sister station) WSCR. Arkush stirred controversy by stating he would not vote for Aaron Rodgers for MVP because he was not vaccinated and therefor "not a good guy".

Family
Arkush and his wife, Candace, have three children; Billy (b. 1978), Arthur (b. 1982), and Taylor (b. 1985). He is of Romanian descent.

References

External links

1953 births
Living people
American radio sports announcers
American people of Romanian descent
Chicago Bears announcers
National Football League announcers
People from Deerfield, Illinois
Southern Illinois University alumni
University of Michigan alumni
Sportswriters from Illinois